Laura Eveliina Birn (born 25 April 1981) is a Finnish film actress.

Birn was born in Helsinki, Finland. She completed her master's degree from Helsinki Theatre Academy in 2008. She is most famous for her appearances in the 2003 film Helmiä ja sikoja alongside Mikko Leppilampi and most notably in her role in the 2005 film Lupaus.  In the United States, she is best known for her supporting role in the Finnish film Joulutarina (English title: Christmas Story) and A Walk Among the Tombstones.

In addition to her native Finnish, Birn also speaks or understands English, Swedish, Portuguese, and Spanish.

Her performance in the 2012 film Purge earned her a nomination for a Satellite Award for Best Actress. She appears in Foundation (2021) as Eto Demerzel.

Filmography
 Stripping (Hengittämättä ja nauramatta, 2002)
 Pearls and Pigs (Helmiä ja sikoja, 2003)
 Promise (Lupaus, 2005)
 Christmas Story (Joulutarina, 2007)
 8 Days to Premiere (8 päivää ensi-iltaan, 2008)
 Ralliraita (2009)
 Must Have Been Love (En som deg, 2012)
 Naked Harbour (Vuosaari, 2012)
 Purge (Puhdistus, 2012)
 Heart of a Lion (Leijonasydän, 2013)
 August Fools (Mieletön elokuu, 2013)
 A Walk Among the Tombstones (2014)
 Henkesi edestä (2015)
 The Ones Below (2015)
 The Girl King (2015)
 Armi elää! (2015)
 Syysprinssi (2016) 
 The Innocents (2018, Netflix) 
 Tyhjiö (2018)
 Bayonet (Bayoneta – Viimeinen isku, 2018)
 Helene (2020)
 Any Day Now (Ensilumi, 2020)
 The Last Ones (2020)
On television:

 Tuulikaappimaa (2003)
 Jumalan kaikki oikut (2006)
 Karjalan kunnailla (2007-2012)
 Onnela (2018)
 Foundation (2021)

Personal life 
Laura Birn is married and has one child.

References

External links

 

1981 births
Living people
Actresses from Helsinki
Finnish film actresses
21st-century Finnish actresses